Polyethoxylated tallow amine (also polyoxyethylene tallowamine, POE-tallowamine) refers to a range of non-ionic surfactants derived from animal fats (tallow). They are a class of polyethoxylated amines (POEAs). The abbreviation 'POEA' is often erroneously used to refer to POE-tallowamine. They are used primarily as emulsifiers and wetting agents for agrochemical formulations, such as pesticides and herbicides (e.g. glyphosate).

Synthesis
Animal fat is hydrolysed to give a mixture of free fatty acids, typically oleic (37–43%), palmitic (24–32%), stearic (20–25%), myristic (3–6%), and linoleic (2–3%). These are then converted to fatty amines via the nitrile process before being ethoxylated with ethylene oxide; this makes them water-soluble and amphiphilic. The length of the fatty tail and degree of exothylation will determine the overall properties of the surfactant. Due to it being synthesized from an impure material POEA is itself a mixture of compounds.

Composition and use
The polyethoxylated tallow amine used as a surfactant is referred to in the literature as MON 0139 or polyoxyethyleneamine (POEA). It is contained in the herbicide Roundup. An ethoxylated tallow amine (CAS No. 61791-26-2), is on the United States Environmental Protection Agency List 3 of Inert Ingredients of Pesticides."

Roundup Pro is a formulation of glyphosate that contains a "phosphate ester neutralized polyethoxylated tallow amine" surfactant; as of 1997 there was no published information regarding the chemical differences between the surfactant in Roundup and Roundup Pro.

POEA concentrations range from <1% in ready-to-use glyphosate formulations to 21% in concentrates. POEA constitutes 15% of Roundup formulations and the phosphate ester neutralized polyethoxylated tallow amine surfactant constitutes 14.5% of Roundup Pro.

Surfactants are added to glyphosate to allow effective uptake of water-soluble glyphosate across plant cuticles, which are hydrophobic, and reduces the amount of glyphosate washed off plants by rain.

Environmental effects
The chemical complexity of POEA makes it difficult to study in the environment.

POEA is toxic to aquatic species like fish and amphibians. Like other surfactants, it can affect membrane transport and can often act as a general narcotic.

In laboratory experiments POEA has a half-life in soils of less than 7 days. Washout from soil is assumed to be minimal, and the estimated half-life in bodies of water would be about 2 weeks. Field experiments have shown that the half-life of POEA in shallow waters is about 13 hours, "further supporting the concept that any potential direct effects of formulated products on organisms in natural waters are likely to occur very shortly post-treatment rather than as a result of chronic or delayed toxicity."

A review of the literature provided to the EPA in 1997 found that POEA was generally more potent in causing toxicity to aquatic organisms than glyphosate, and that POEA becomes more potent in more alkaline environments. (Potency is measured by the median lethal dose (LD50); a low LD50 means that just a little of the substance is lethal; a high LD50 means that it takes a high dose to kill.) Glyphosate has an LD50 ranging from 4.2 times that of POEA for midge larvae at pH 6.5, to 369 times that of POEA for rainbow trout at pH 9.5 (for comparison, at pH 6.5 the LC50 of glyphosate was 70 times that of POEA for rainbow trout). The pH value of most freshwater streams and lakes is between 6.0 and 9.0; fish species are harmed by water having a pH value outside of this range.

Human toxicity 
A review published in 2000 examining the toxicity of POEA and other components in glyphosate formulations found "no convincing evidence for direct DNA damage in vitro or in vivo, and it was concluded that Roundup and its components do not pose a risk for the production of heritable/somatic mutations in humans. ...Glyphosate, AMPA, and POEA were not teratogenic or developmentally toxic. …Likewise there were no adverse effects in reproductive tissues from animals treated with glyphosate, AMPA, or POEA in chronic and/or subchronic studies."

Another review, published in 2004, said that with respect to glyphosate formulations, "experimental studies suggest that the toxicity of the surfactant, polyoxyethyleneamine (POEA), is greater than the toxicity of glyphosate alone and commercial formulations alone. There is insufficient evidence to conclude that glyphosate preparations containing POEA are more toxic than those containing alternative surfactants. Although surfactants probably contribute to the acute toxicity of glyphosate formulations, the weight of evidence is against surfactants potentiating the toxicity of glyphosate."

References

Non-ionic surfactants